Algernon Lee Butler (August 2, 1905 – September 5, 1978) was a United States district judge of the United States District Court for the Eastern District of North Carolina.

Education and career

Born in Clinton, North Carolina, Butler attended the University of North Carolina School of Law, and read law in 1928 to enter the bar. He entered private practice in Clinton in 1928, and was a member of the North Carolina House of Representatives in 1931, and a county attorney of Sampson County, North Carolina from 1938 to 1951.

Federal judicial service

On July 28, 1959, Butler was nominated by President Dwight D. Eisenhower to a seat on the United States District Court for the Eastern District of North Carolina vacated by Judge Donnell Gilliam. Butler was confirmed by the United States Senate on August 28, 1959, and received his commission on August 31, 1959. He served as Chief Judge from 1961 to 1975, assuming senior status on August 2, 1975, and serving in that capacity until his death on September 5, 1978.

References

Sources
 

1905 births
1978 deaths
Members of the North Carolina House of Representatives
Judges of the United States District Court for the Eastern District of North Carolina
United States district court judges appointed by Dwight D. Eisenhower
20th-century American judges
20th-century American lawyers
United States federal judges admitted to the practice of law by reading law
People from Clinton, North Carolina
20th-century American politicians